Zoran Manojlović (born 21 July 1962) is a Serbian football coach who manages Egyptian club Al Ittihad.

Career
Manojlović began his coaching career in Portugal.

Manojlović coached three club sides in Angola, including Primeiro de Agosto (between December 2017 and July 2019) whom he guided to the African Champions League semi-final in 2018. He also served as an assistant coach at Kabuscorp in 2012.

Manojlović was appointed head coach of Moroccan club Wydad AC in July 2019. In November 2019 he said he was "thrilled" to be working at the club. He left the club in January 2020.

In October 2020 he became manager of Sudanese club Al-Hilal Club.

In April 2021 he became manager of Algerian club CR Belouizdad.

On 30 August 2021, Manojlović was appointed as the manager of Saudi Arabian club Al-Tai. On 4 November 2021, he was sacked with the club sitting at the bottom of the table.

In June 2022 he became manager of Tanzanian club Simba.

In September 2022, he became manager of Egyptian club Al Ittihad.

Honours
 CR Belouizdad
 Algerian Ligue Professionnelle 1 (1): 2020–21

References

1962 births
Living people
Serbian football managers
Kabuscorp S.C.P. non-playing staff
C.D. Primeiro de Agosto managers
Wydad AC managers
Al-Hilal Club (Omdurman) managers
CR Belouizdad managers
Al-Ta'ee managers
Simba S.C. managers
Saudi Professional League managers
Serbian expatriate football managers
Serbian expatriate sportspeople in Portugal
Expatriate football managers in Portugal
Serbian expatriate sportspeople in Angola
Expatriate football managers in Angola
Serbian expatriate sportspeople in Morocco
Expatriate football managers in Morocco
Serbian expatriate sportspeople in Sudan
Expatriate football managers in Sudan
Serbian expatriate sportspeople in Algeria
Expatriate football managers in Algeria
Serbian expatriate sportspeople in Saudi Arabia
Expatriate football managers in Saudi Arabia
Serbian expatriate sportspeople in Tanzania
Expatriate football managers in Tanzania
Serbian expatriate sportspeople in Egypt
Expatriate football managers in Egypt
Botola managers
Al Ittihad Alexandria Club managers